Fritz Kunst (12 November 1899–October 13, 1979) was a German politician of the Communist Party and SED, and mayor of Greiz and Jena.

Life 
Born in Greiz, Kunst was a member of the Communist Party (KPD) at its founding in 1918 and was a leader in the labour sport movement (Arbeiter-Turn- und -Sportbewegung). During the Third Reich he was active in the Communist resistance and was arrested several times and tortured by the Gestapo.  After the end of the war, within the Soviet Occupation Zone, he became a local leader (Kreisleiter) for the KPD (and from 1946, SED). In 1948, he was elected mayor of his hometown Greiz with the support of the Soviet commandant. From 1953 to 1960, he was mayor of the city of Jena.

Honours 
 On 12 November 1969, the city of Jena conferred honorary citizenship upon Kunst. This was rescinded on 20 March 1991.
 The city of Jena also named a street after Kunst, which has since been renamed to Schrödingerstraße.

References 
Hitlers zweimal getötete Opfer. Westdeutsche Endlösung des Antifaschismus, 1994, p. 232
Sowjetische Kommandanturen und deutsche Verwaltung in der SBZ und frühen DDR, 2015, p. 204

Links 
 Fritz Kunst in 1945 on the balcony of the Greiz city hall

1899 births
1979 deaths
Communists in the German Resistance
Socialist Unity Party of Germany politicians
Communist Party of Germany politicians
People from Greiz
Mayors of Jena